Alessandro Damasceni Peretti di Montalto (1571 – 2 June 1623) was an Italian Catholic Cardinal Bishop. He received the title by his uncle Felice Peretti after the latter was elected Pope Sixtus V on 24 April 1585, in the consistory on 13 May, and was installed as Cardinal Deacon of San Girolamo dei Croati on 14 June 1585; the cardinal was then fourteen years old. The Republic of Venice inscribed him in the Libro d'Oro as a patrician of Venice that same year. Though he was made the permanent governor of Fermo the following year, and was often the papal legate in Bologna, he was not made a bishop until 1620, when he became Cardinal-Bishop of Albano. He served also as Vice-Chancellor of the Holy Roman Church (1589–1623) and Cardinal Protector of the Kingdom of Poland (named on 19 September 1589 by King Zygmunt III Waza) and of the several religious orders.

Alessandro Peretti was born at Montalto delle Marche, the son of Fabio Damasceni and Maria Felice Mignucci Peretti, who was a niece of the pope on her mother's side. Like his great-uncle before him, Alessandro Peretti was also known as Cardinal di Montalto. His primary works as a great patron were the Villa Lante at Bagnaia, where he contributed to the gardens a casino matching the earlier one, and the church (though not the facade) of Sant'Andrea della Valle in Rome, (begun in 1591), where Carlo Maderno constructed at the Cardinal's personal expense the second-largest dome in Rome, 1608 to 1621.

As a cardinal, Peretti lived an extravagant lifestyle in which he indulged his taste for music and lavish theatrical productions staged in his residence, the Cancelleria palace. He retained several musicians in his service and encouraged the art of monody or solo song.

His portrait bust by Gian Lorenzo Bernini is at the Hamburg Kunsthalle. Surviving books from Cardinal Alessandro's library reflect pride in his relationship to the Pope through elaborate armorials and his perfect taste.

Cardinal Montalto was in turn the uncle of Cardinal Francesco Peretti di Montalto (1597‑1655), raised to the purple in 1641.

References

Sources
 James Chater, "Music and Patronage in Rome: the Case of Cardinal Montalto", Studi musicali, xvi (1987), 179–227
 Hill, John Walter, Roman Monody, Cantata, and Opera from the Circles around Cardinal Montalto. Two volumes. Oxford, Clarendon Press, 1997

External links
Biographical Dictionary of the Cardinals of the Roman catholic Church:
Rome Art Lover webpage: San Andrea della Valle

1571 births
1623 deaths
People from the Province of Ascoli Piceno
17th-century Italian cardinals
Cardinal-bishops of Albano
Cardinal-nephews